Panyabungan is a town in the North Sumatra province of Indonesia and it is the seat (capital) of Mandailing Natal Regency.

Climate
Panyabungan has a tropical rainforest climate (Af) with heavy to very heavy rainfall year-round.

References

Populated places in North Sumatra
Regency seats of North Sumatra